Mayeur is a French surname. Notable people with the surname include:

Bernard Mayeur (1938–2004), French basketball player
Jean Mayeur (1928–1997), French jeweller
Yvan Mayeur (born 1960), Belgian politician

See also
Adrien-Jean Le Mayeur (1880–1958), Belgian painter

French-language surnames